"Li'l Liza Jane", also known as "Little Liza Jane", "Liza Jane", and "Goodbye Liza Jane", is a song dating back at least to the 1910s. It has become a perennial standard both as a song and an instrumental in traditional jazz, folk music, and bluegrass, and versions have repeatedly appeared in other genres including rock and roll. Numerous scholars and musicologists have written about the song, and it is one of the standards of the New Orleans brass band tradition.

Origins

"Li'l Liza Jane" was first published in 1916 by Sherman, Clay & Co of San Francisco, California as a composition by Countess Ada de Lachau (Ada Louise Metz, 1866-1956).  It was described as a "Southern dialect song". The tune was featured as entr'acte entertainment during the 1916-1917 Broadway show Come Out of the Kitchen.

The song's origins, however, seem to go back even earlier. Lucy Thurston remembered a song with the refrain "Ohoooooooo lil Liza, lil Liza Jane" being sung by slaves in the area of Covington, Louisiana before the American Civil War.  While the melody is not preserved in the written interview, the lyrics and their rhythm strongly suggest it was the same or very similar to the song published decades later.

The name "Liza Jane" or "Eliza Jane" was a standard female character name in minstrel shows. A tune "Goodbye, Liza Jane" was published by Eddie Fox in 1871. Harry Von Tilzer published "Goodbye, Eliza Jane" in 1903, which has some similarity to the later "Li'l Liza Jane".

Natalie Curtis Burlin's book Negro Folk-Songs, published in 1918, documents a version said to be a Negro folk song with an associated dancing game. In the "Liza Jane" dance, couples would dance in a circle, with an extra man in the middle. The extra man would "steal partners" with one of the couples, and the odd man out would go into the center and do a solo dance, then in cut in on another couple and the process would repeat.

The melody of the chorus is shared with the West African welcome song "Fanga Alafia".

Selected list of recordings
Earl Fuller's Jazz Band featuring Ted Lewis on clarinet recorded a version of the tune for Victor Records in September 1917 that sold well and helped establish the tune as an early jazz standard. Fuller's band recorded it as an instrumental other than an ensemble vocal chant "Oh, Li'l Liza, Little Liza Jane" on part of the chorus.

The 1918 recording with singing and banjo by Harry C. Browne for Columbia Records helped establish the number in old time country music, although it was not the first recording of the number as has sometimes been claimed.

Fats Domino recorded the song in November 1958 for his album Let's Play Fats Domino (1959).

New Orleans' Huey "Piano" Smith & the Clowns recorded "Li'l Liza Jane" in 1956. It reappeared for the 1959 album debut Having a Good Time with Huey 'Piano' Smith & His Clowns.

Bing Crosby included the song in a medley on his album 101 Gang Songs (1961)

Cotton Mill Boys recorded the song and issued it as a B side to their single "Goodbye My Darling" (1969)

Scott Dunbar on his 1972 album "From Lake Mary"

The Ebony Hillbillies recorded "Liza Jane" on the albums - 'Sabrina's Holiday' and 'I Thought You Knew'

Wynton Marsalis in 1997

Bob Wills and his Texas Playboys had a hit with their 1947 recording.

Nina Simone performed the song for many years. It first appeared on her 1960 album Nina Simone at Newport.

The 1964 record "Liza Jane" by "Davie Jones with The King Bees" is David Bowie's first record. Although composer credit was given to Leslie Conn, it is an arrangement of this old standard.

The Band recorded a version in 1968 called "Go Go Liza Jane".

Alison Krauss & Union Station's record won a 1998 Grammy Award in the Best Country Instrumental Performance category.

The New Orleans Nightcrawlers version entitled "Funky Liza" appears on their 2001 album "Mardi Gras in New Orleans".

Otis Taylor recorded a version of this song for his 2008 album "Recapturing the Banjo."  An album dedicated to black musicians playing traditional blues banjo music.  Also on the album are Keb' Mo', Corey Harris, Alvin Youngblood Hart, and Guy Davis.

Dr. John recorded a version of this song for his 1972 album "Dr. John's Gumbo."

Documentary film 
"Li'l Liza Jane" is also the subject of a forthcoming documentary film, Li'l Liza Jane: A Movie About a Song, featuring the harmonica playing of Phil Wiggins, and contextual interviews.

See also
 List of pre-1920 jazz standards

Notes

References
 1916 sheet music
 Come Out of the Kitchen, ibdb
 Goodbye, Liza Jane (1871)
 Earl Fuller's Famous Jazz Band
 Negro Folk-Songs by Natalie Curtis Burlin, Schirmer, 1918, pages 158-161

External links
 
 Relation between Lil' Liza Jane and Fanga

1916 songs
American country music songs
American folk songs
Songs about fictional female characters
1910s jazz standards
Dixieland jazz standards
Western swing songs
Dr. John songs
Huey "Piano" Smith songs